Florian Alt (born 30 April 1996 in Gummersbach) is a German Grand Prix motorcycle racer. He currently competes in the Endurance FIM World Championship aboard a Yamaha YZF-R1. He was the 2012 Red Bull MotoGP Rookies Cup champion. He has previously competed in the IDM Superbike Championship, where he was runner-up in 2016 and 2017, the CEV Moto2 Championship, finishing runner-up in 2014 and the IDM 125GP Championship.

In 2020 he will be returning on the IDM Superbike 1000, racing for Team Wilbers-BMW-Racing in a BMW S 1000 RR.

Career statistics

Red Bull MotoGP Rookies Cup

Races by year
(key) (Races in bold indicate pole position, races in italics indicate fastest lap)

Grand Prix motorcycle racing

By season

Races by year
(key) (Races in bold indicate pole position; races in italics indicate fastest lap)

References

External links

1996 births
Living people
German motorcycle racers
Moto3 World Championship riders
Moto2 World Championship riders
People from Gummersbach
Sportspeople from Cologne (region)